The Colombia national under-15 football team represents Colombia in international under-15 football competitions and is overseen by the Colombian Football Federation.

Competitive record
*Draws include knockout matches decided on penalty kicks.
**Gold background colour indicates that the tournament was won.
***Red border colour indicates tournament was held on home soil.

 Champions   Runners-up  Third Place   Fourth place

Youth Olympic Games

South American U-15 Championship
From 2013, the champion qualifies for the Youth Olympic Games.

Schedule and results

2019

Current squad
The following players were named for the 2017 South American Under-15 Football Championship.

Honours
South American U-15 Championship:
 Runners-up (3): 2004, 2011, 2013

See also
 Colombia national football team
 Colombia national futsal team
 Colombia Olympic football team
 Colombia national under-20 football team
 Colombia national under-17 football team

References

External links
Colombian Football Federation official website

F
South American national under-15 association football teams